The Anvil was an American literary and political activist magazine edited by  Jack Conroy in the 1930s. The magazine had a leftist stance and was subtitled "Stories for Workers". According to Douglas C. Wixson, its story "would make an important chapter in the history of American literature if the 1930s were properly recognized in standard textbooks."

History and profile
The Anvil was first published out of Moberly, Missouri, in May 1933 (ib.).  Among the authors whose works appeared in the magazine were Richard Wright, Nelson Algren, Erskine Caldwell, Frank Yerby and Maxim Gorky.  In 1935, The Anvil was folded into the Partisan Review (ib.,p. xIv).

References

Defunct political magazines published in the United States
Defunct literary magazines published in the United States
Magazines established in 1933
Magazines established in 1935
Magazines published in Columbia, Missouri
Socialist magazines